Abdul-Yussuf Adedeji Adeniyi "Deji" Oshilaja (born 16 July 1993) is an English professional footballer who plays as a defender for Burton Albion in EFL League One.

Career

Cardiff City
Born in Bermondsey, Oshilaja joined Cardiff City as a 16-year-old, progressing through the academy to sign his first professional contract in April 2012. His professional debut for Cardiff came on 14 August 2012, in a 2–1 defeat to Northampton Town in the Football League Cup. Oshilaja made his second appearance in another cup game in the new year, which also resulted in a 2–1 loss against Macclesfield Town. Despite this, Manager Malky Mackay praised Oshilaja's performance, describing it as "great courage". At the end of the season, Oshilaja was offered a new contract by the club.

On 31 October 2013, Oshilaja joined Newport County on a one-month loan. He made his Football League début for Newport on 2 November 2013 versus Fleetwood Town. He scored his first goal for Newport in the 3–0 win versus Portsmouth in the Football League Trophy match on 12 November 2013. His loan spell at Newport was extended and he returned to Cardiff City in January 2014, which he made eight appearances for the club.

On 7 February 2014, Oshilaja was loaned to Sheffield Wednesday until 12 March. He then made his Sheffield Wednesday debut on 11 February 2014, playing as a centre-back, in a 3–0 loss against Wigan Athletic. His second appearance came on 12 March 2014, also came against Wigan, which Sheffield Wednesday lost 1–0 for the second time in the 2013–14 season. Oshilaja loan spell with Sheffield Wednesday was extended until the end of the season. However, Oshilaja never made another appearance for the club and returned to Cardiff City.

On 8 January 2015, Oshilaja was loaned to AFC Wimbledon until the end of the season. Oshilaja made his Wimbledon debut three days later, on 11 January 2015, in a 2–1 loss against Stevenage. Oshilaja then scored his first goal for the club on 7 March 2015, in a 2–1 win over York City. After making twenty-three appearances for the club, Oshilaja's performance saw him being awarded Natalie Callow Memorial Trophy for AFCW Young Player of the Year. and returned to his parent club on 16 June 2015.

Oshilaja was sent out on a six-month loan to Gillingham on 24 July 2015, where he scored on the opening day of the season, in a 4–0 win against Sheffield United. Three weeks later on 29 August 2015, Oshilaja scored his second goal of the season against Peterborough United. However, Oshilaja suffered a knee injury during the match and was sidelined for two months. After two months on the sidelines, Oshilaja made his return in the first team, in the quarter final of the Football League Trophy, against Yeovil Town, in which he made his first start. Having formed a strong defensive partnership with John Egan in the first half of the season, Oshilaja was recalled by Cardiff in January. He later returned to the club on 14 March 2016 for a second loan spell until the end of the season. On 6 July 2016 he re-joined Gillingham on a season-long loan.

AFC Wimbledon
On 8 June 2017, Oshilaja agreed a deal to join AFC Wimbledon on 1 July, following the expiration of his contract with Cardiff. He was named captain for AFC Wimbledon for the 2018–19 season.. In May 2019, Wimbledon released Oshilaja.

Charlton Athletic
On 22 July 2019, Oshilaja was signed by Charlton Athletic following his release from AFC Wimbledon for free on a two-year deal. He scored his first goal for Charlton in a 2-0 win against Rochdale on 6 February 2021.

On 18 May 2021, it was announced that Oshilaja would leave Charlton Athletic at the end of his contract.

Burton Albion
On 10 June 2021, Oshilaja signed for Burton Albion.

Personal life
Born in England, Oshilaja is of Nigerian descent.

Career statistics

Honours
Individual
AFC Wimbledon Player of the Year: 2017–18

References

External links

1993 births
Living people
Footballers from Bermondsey
English footballers
Association football defenders
Cardiff City F.C. players
Newport County A.F.C. players
Sheffield Wednesday F.C. players
AFC Wimbledon players
Gillingham F.C. players
Charlton Athletic F.C. players
Burton Albion F.C. players
English Football League players
English people of Nigerian descent
Black British sportspeople